Umberto Saracco (born 10 April 1994) is an Italian footballer who plays as a goalkeeper for  club Audace Cerignola.

Career
He is a product of Torino youth teams and played for the club's Under-19 squad in the 2012–13 and 2013–14 seasons.

He joined Serie C club Cosenza before the 2014–15 season. He made his Serie C debut for Cosenza on 20 September 2014 in a game against Lupa Roma. He extended his Cosenza contract twice.

On 17 January 2022, he signed with Fidelis Andria.

On 16 July 2022, he moved to Audace Cerignola.

Honours
Cosenza
Coppa Italia Serie C: 2014–15

References

External links
 

1994 births
Living people
People from Moncalieri
Sportspeople from the Metropolitan City of Turin
Footballers from Piedmont
Italian footballers
Association football goalkeepers
Serie B players
Serie C players
Torino F.C. players
Cosenza Calcio players
S.S. Fidelis Andria 1928 players
S.S.D. Audace Cerignola players